Ceylonosticta alwisi
Ceylonosticta anamia
Ceylonosticta bine
Ceylonosticta mirifica
Ceylonosticta mojca
Ceylonosticta nancyae
Ceylonosticta rupasinghe
Ceylonosticta venusta
Drepanosticta actaeon
Drepanosticta adami
Drepanosticta amboinensis
Drepanosticta anascephala
Drepanosticta annandalei
Drepanosticta annulata
Drepanosticta arcuata
Drepanosticta aries
Drepanosticta attala
Drepanosticta auriculata
Drepanosticta austeni
Drepanosticta barbatula
Drepanosticta bartelsi
Drepanosticta belyshevi
Drepanosticta berinchangensis
Drepanosticta berlandi
Drepanosticta bicolor
Drepanosticta bicornuta
Drepanosticta bifida
Drepanosticta bispana
Drepanosticta brincki
Drepanosticta brownelli
Drepanosticta carmichaeli
Drepanosticta ceratophora
Drepanosticta claaseni
Drepanosticta clavata
Drepanosticta conica
Drepanosticta crenitis
Drepanosticta dendrolagina
Drepanosticta dentifera
Drepanosticta digna
Drepanosticta doisuthepensis
Drepanosticta dorcadion
Drepanosticta drusilla
Drepanosticta dulitensis
Drepanosticta dupophila
Drepanosticta elongata
Drepanosticta ephippiata
Drepanosticta eucera
Drepanosticta exoleta
Drepanosticta floresiana
Drepanosticta fontinalis
Drepanosticta forficula
Drepanosticta fraseri
Drepanosticta gazella
Drepanosticta halmachera
Drepanosticta halterata
Drepanosticta hamadryas
Drepanosticta hamulifera
Drepanosticta hilaris
Drepanosticta hongkongensis
Drepanosticta inconspicua
Drepanosticta inversa
Drepanosticta jurzitzai
Drepanosticta khaochongensis
Drepanosticta kruegeri
Drepanosticta lankanensis
Drepanosticta lepyricollis
Drepanosticta lestoides
Drepanosticta lymetta
Drepanosticta magna
Drepanosticta marsyas
Drepanosticta megametta
Drepanosticta misoolensis
Drepanosticta moluccana
Drepanosticta monoceros
Drepanosticta montana
Drepanosticta moorei
Drepanosticta mylitta
Drepanosticta nietneri
Drepanosticta obiensis
Drepanosticta palauensis
Drepanosticta pan
Drepanosticta penicillata
Drepanosticta philippa
Drepanosticta polychromatica
Drepanosticta psygma
Drepanosticta quadrata
Drepanosticta robusta
Drepanosticta rudicula
Drepanosticta rufostigma
Drepanosticta sembilanensis
Drepanosticta septima
Drepanosticta sharpi
Drepanosticta siebersi
Drepanosticta silenus
Drepanosticta sinhalensis
Drepanosticta siu
Drepanosticta spatulifera
Drepanosticta starmuehlneri
Drepanosticta submontana
Drepanosticta subtropica
Drepanosticta sundana
Drepanosticta taurus
Drepanosticta tenella
Drepanosticta trimaculata
Drepanosticta tropica
Drepanosticta versicolor
Drepanosticta vietnamica
Drepanosticta viridis
Drepanosticta walli
Drepanosticta watuwilensis
Drepanosticta zhoui
Palaemnaea abbreviata
Palaemnema apicalis
Palaemnema azupizui
Palaemnema baltodanoi
Palaemnema bilobulata
Palaemnema brevignoni
Palaemnema brucei
Palaemnema brucelli
Palaemnema carmelita
Palaemnema chiriquita
Palaemnema clementia
Palaemnema collaris
Palaemnema croceicauda
Palaemnema cyclohamulata
Palaemnema dentata
Palaemnema desiderata
Palaemnema distadens
Palaemnema domina
Palaemnema edmondi
Palaemnema gigantula
Palaemnema joanetta
Palaemnema lorena
Palaemnema martini
Palaemnema melanocauda
Palaemnema melanostigma
Palaemnema melanota
Palaemnema melanura
Palaemnema mutans
Palaemnema nathalia
Palaemnema orientalis
Palaemnema paulicaxa
Palaemnema paulicoba
Palaemnema paulina
Palaemnema paulirica
Palaemnema paulitaba
Palaemnema paulitoyaca
Palaemnema peruviana
Palaemnema picicaudata
Palaemnema reventazoni
Palaemnema spinulata
Palaemnema tepuica
Platysticta apicalis
Platysticta deccanensis
Platysticta maculata
Platysticta secreta
Platysticta serendibica
Protosticta antelopoides
Protosticta beaumonti
Protosticta bivittata
Protosticta coomansi
Protosticta curiosa
Protosticta damacornu
Protosticta davenporti
Protosticta feronia
Protosticta foersteri
Protosticta fraseri
Protosticta geijskesi
Protosticta gracilis
Protosticta grandis
Protosticta gravelyi
Protosticta hearseyi
Protosticta himalaica
Protosticta khaosoidaoensis
Protosticta kiautai
Protosticta kinabaluensis
Protosticta linduensis
Protosticta marenae
Protosticta maurenbrecheri
Protosticta medusa
Protosticta mortoni
Protosticta pariwonoi
Protosticta reslae
Protosticta robusta
Protosticta rozendalorum
Protosticta rufostigma
Protosticta sanguinostigma
Protosticta simplicinervis
Protosticta taipokauensis
Protosticta trilobata
Protosticta uncata
Protosticta vanderstarrei
Sinosticta hainanense
Sinosticta ogatai

References